John F. Cunningham (died 1954) was an Irish medical practitioner and an independent member of Seanad Éireann.

He was elected to the 7th Seanad on 25 February 1953 at a by-election for the National University constituency caused by the death of Helena Concannon. He lost his seat at the 1954 election.

References

Year of birth missing
1954 deaths
Independent members of Seanad Éireann
Members of the 7th Seanad
Irish surgeons
Members of Seanad Éireann for the National University of Ireland